Pașcani is a city in Iași County, Romania.

Pașcani may also refer to:

Pașcani, Criuleni, a commune in Criuleni district, Moldova
Pașcani, Hîncești, a commune in Hîncești district, Moldova
Pașcani, a village in Manta Commune, Cahul district, Moldova